Barfleur is a commune and fishing village in Manche, Normandy, northwestern France.

History 
During the Middle Ages, Barfleur was one of the chief ports of embarkation for England.

 1066: A large medallion fixed to a rock in the harbour marks the Normans' departure from Barfleur before the battle of Hastings.
 1120: The , carrying the sole legitimate heir to Henry I of England, William Adelin, went down outside the harbour, setting the stage for the period of civil war in England known as the Anarchy.
 1194: Richard I of England departed from Barfleur on return to England following his captivity by Henry VI, Holy Roman Emperor.
 1692: Action at Barfleur, part of the battles of Barfleur and La Hougue
 1944: Barfleur was occupied by the Germans during WWII. As allied forces approached following the D-Day invasion, the German commander evacuated the city prior to any confrontation to ensure that it would not be damaged, as he liked the city so much.

Demographics

Geography 
It is twinned with Lyme Regis in the UK. A Brittany Ferries vessel is named after the village and operates from nearby Cherbourg-Octeville to Poole in the UK.

Barfleur is the exact antipode of New Zealand's Antipodes Islands.

See also 
 Communes of the Manche department

Footnotes

External links 

  

Communes of Manche
Plus Beaux Villages de France
Port cities and towns on the French Atlantic coast
Ports and harbours of the English Channel